Adil Salahi is a scholar, author and translator, who has written or translated into English various books on Islam. He formerly taught at the Markfield Institute of Higher Education. He was also, for over thirty years, the editor of 'Islam in Perspective', a regular full-page column in the Arab News, a Saudi daily newspaper.

Publications

References

Arabic–English translators
British scholars of Islam